The Stordal Tunnel is a  long road tunnel in Fjord Municipality, Møre og Romsdal county, Norway. The tunnel is located on Norwegian County Road 650, on the eastern shore of the Storfjorden.

The tunnel was officially opened on 27 June 1998 by Prime Minister Kjell Magne Bondevik. The tunnel was part of a project to replace the old, narrow, avalanche-prone road that followed the shoreline of the fjord. Neither the old road nor the old tunnel are used anymore since the new tunnel provides a safer and shorter drive. This is the third in a series of three tunnels connecting Sjøholt (in Ørskog Municipality) to the village of Stordal.

References

Fjord (municipality)
Road tunnels in Møre og Romsdal